Steve Krisiloff (born July 7, 1946 in Parsippany-Troy Hills, New Jersey), is a former driver in the USAC and CART Championship Car series.  He raced in the 1969–1979, 1981 and 1983 seasons, with 111 combined career starts, and started in the Indianapolis 500 all but 1969–1970.  He finished in the top ten 46 times, with his best finish in 2nd position in 1978 at Phoenix.

After racing, he served from 1984 to 1995 as vice-president of the Indianapolis Motor Speedway and later as the team manager for Patrick Racing and assistant team manager for PKV Racing until 2006.

Krisiloff was married to Josie George (daughter of Mari Hulman George) from 1985 to 1993. Tony George, CEO of the Indianapolis Motor Speedway Corporation and founder of the Indy Racing League and Vision Racing, is his former brother-in-law.

Krisiloff and Josie George had a son, Kyle Krisiloff, who has raced in the NASCAR Busch and Craftsman Truck Series. Krisiloff served as team manager for Carl A. Haas Motorsports, for whom Kyle drove the #14 Ford Fusion with Clabber Girl sponsorship in the 2007 NASCAR Busch Series.

Indianapolis 500 results

See also
List of select Jewish racing drivers

External links
Driver DB Profile

1946 births
Champ Car drivers
Hulman-George_family
Living people
Indianapolis 500 drivers
People from Parsippany-Troy Hills, New Jersey
Racing drivers from New Jersey
Sportspeople from Morris County, New Jersey